Educated (2018) is a memoir by the American author Tara Westover. Westover recounts overcoming her survivalist Mormon family in order to go to college, and emphasizes the importance of education in enlarging her world. She details her journey from her isolated life in the mountains of Idaho to completing a PhD program in history at Cambridge University. She started college at the age of 17 having had no formal education. She explores her struggle to reconcile her desire to learn with the world she inhabited with her father.

As of the September 13, 2020, issue of The New York Times, the book had spent 132 consecutive weeks on the Hardcover Non-Fiction Best Seller list. It won a 2019 Alex Award and was shortlisted for the Los Angeles Times Book Prize, PEN America's Jean Stein Book Award, and two awards from the National Book Critics Circle Award.

Summary 
Westover is raised in isolation in Buck's Peak, Idaho by her parents, pseudonymously referred to as Gene and Faye Westover respectively. Gene was paranoid about hospitals, public education, and the government, partially due to the siege at Ruby Ridge. Faye consequently homeschools the Westover children. 

Gene denies Westover's attempts to seek normality in her life. Her brother Shawn initially helps her and the two grow closer but he starts physically abusing her as she befriends Charles, a boy she meets while performing in theater. Another of Westover's brothers, Tyler, learns of the abuse and encourages her to leave home and take the ACT to be able to apply to Brigham Young University (BYU). Westover is later admitted to BYU under a scholarship. Shawn reconciles with her after standing up to Gene on her behalf.

Sometime later, Westover studies at the University of Cambridge and receives scholarships that allow her to continue attending. The pressure of maintaining her grades in order to keep her scholarship results in Westover feeling stressed. Additionally, her alienation from the outside world and lack of formal schooling become issues.  

Later, Westover reconnects with Charles, but is unable to act romantically towards him because of her conservative upbringing. Remembering Gene's and Shawn's abuse towards her, results in Westover terminating her relationship with Charles. 

Westover now feels alienated in Idaho and worries that Gene may have bipolar disorder. She cuts ties with him, but reconnects after he expresses interest in her life at school. After Shawn marries Emily, a young woman he was dating, Westover worries about Emily who previously expressed fear of Shawn.  

Westover confides to one of her professors about her family. Her professor encourages her to apply for the studying abroad program at Cambridge. After arriving at King's College, Westover is assigned to work with Professor Jonathan Steinberg. Both of her professors encourage her to attend graduate school. Westover applies for and wins the Gates Scholarship and forms a temporary truce with Gene. The two previously fell out over how she chronicled her past to local news outlets and her decision to attend school in England. 

After returning to Cambridge, Westover takes steps to be part of the world, including getting immunized for vaccinations her family rejected. She occasionally returns to Idaho where she learns that Shawn is still abusing Emily. Her sister, Audrey, learned about Shawn's behavior, but Faye does not believe her. Westover and Faye take up email correspondence through which the latter suggests that Gene is mentally ill and writes about how they plan to get Shawn the help he needs. On another trip home, Shawn briefly shows signs of change, but later accuses Audrey of lying about his abusive behavior and threatens to kill her. Gene and Faye do not take Westover seriously when she tells them about Shawn's threat. 

Westover encounters Shawn with a bloody knife on another visit home. Terrified, she lies that Gene lied about Shawn's treatment to Audrey. Later, she realizes that Faye had never been on her or Audrey's side. After returning to England, Shawn threatens her life. Audrey also cuts ties with Westover, claiming she is under Satan's control. Westover then begins graduate school at Harvard and her parents briefly visit and try to convince her to come home.

After returning home again, Westover discovers that Erin, Shawn's ex-girlfriend, wrote to Faye that she was delusional and demonizing her brother. Westover returns to Harvard and eventually England. After suffering panic attacks, she ends contact with her parents for a year, attempting to recover. She struggles in her studies, but Tyler encourages her and she successfully completes her PhD. 

Years later Westover returns to Idaho for her maternal grandmother's funeral. She reunites with Tyler, his wife, two maternal aunts and her other siblings, most of whom still take Gene's and Shawn's side. At the end of the memoir, Westover is in touch with only a few family members and accepts that she needs to be away from the mountain.

People featured in the book

Westover family

 Gene Westover (pseudonym): Westover's father, who did not believe in public education or doctors. He owns a metal scrapyard in Idaho.
 Faye Westover (pseudonym): Westover's mother, a midwife and herbal specialist. She teaches her children at home.
 Tony Westover: Westover's oldest brother and first child of their parents. He is noted only as working with their father at the scrapyard.
 Shawn Westover (pseudonym): Westover's older brother, the second brother of the siblings. Shawn was physically, mentally and emotionally abusive toward Westover, and later to his wife.
 Tyler Westover: Westover's older brother, the third brother of the seven siblings. Tyler is the first to go to college, and he encourages Westover to take the ACT so she can apply and go, too. He supports her against their parents and brother Shawn.
 Luke Westover: Westover's older brother, the fourth brother. Luke is depicted as the brother who caught fire in the scrapyard and Westover had to help Faye nurse him back to health.
 Richard Westover: Westover's older brother, fifth of the brothers. Richard remains loyal to the Mormon religion, and gives up his parental compelled isolation. He pursues higher education and marries.
 Audrey Westover (pseudonym): Westover's only sister. She helps their mother with the herbal business. Although not close, Westover and Audrey together confront their mother about the abuse they suffered from Shawn. Audrey later cuts Westover out of her life, fearful of being disowned by their parents.
 Tara Westover: Youngest child and writer of memoir.
 Grandma-down-the-hill: Gene's mother. She often disagrees with Gene about his family, and encourages Westover to get an education and escape so she can live a normal life.
 Grandma-over-in-town: Faye's mother. A prim and proper woman whom Westover didn't really connect with when she was growing up. She doesn't approve of Gene and became estranged from her daughter Faye after her marriage.
Aunt Debbie: Faye's estranged sister. After Westover distanced herself from her family, Debbie accepted her and Tyler with open arms. She helped Westover get her passport so she could study abroad.
Aunt Angie: Faye's other estranged sister. Angie was cast out of the Westover family after filing for unemployment when she was fired from the family business. Gene thought Angie was trying to put him on a government watchlist.

Other major people 

 Charles: Westover's first "boyfriend". Clouded by her father's teachings, Westover is never able to get intimate with Charles. She ends up distancing herself from him when Shawn's abuse gets worse and he tries to tell her that Shawn's behavior wasn't normal. They remain friends to this day.
Drew: Westover's boyfriend during the third part of the memoir. He is the first boyfriend whom she tells about her family and her upbringing.
 Dr. Kerry: Westover's professor at BYU. He helps her get a spot in the study abroad program to Cambridge and encourages/supports her in her academic career.
Dr. Jonathan Steinberg: Westover's advisor at Cambridge. He finds her talented and takes an interest in her education.
 Erin: One of Shawn's ex-girlfriends. Westover reaches out to her in hopes she will help corroborate Westover's timeline of Shawn's abuse. Whilst "helping" her, Erin also communicates with Faye, saying that Westover is "demonizing" Shawn.
 Sadie: Another of Shawn's ex-girlfriends. She also suffered from Shawn's psychological abuse. 
 Robin: Westover's second-year roommate. She helps her adjust to living with strangers and other aspects of life off the mountain.
 Emily Westover: Shawn's wife, who is nearly a decade younger than he. Westover describes her as "compliant", and predicts that Shawn will abuse and manipulate her. 
 Stefanie Westover: Tyler's wife. She helps him transition into the larger world. She supports Tyler when he confronts his parents about Shawn's abuse of Westover.
 Kami Westover: Richard's wife.
 Benjamin: Audrey's husband.

Background 
Of her upbringing, Westover has said, "My father created our reality in a really meaningful way because we were so isolated. He would say these things about public education and doctors and the government and we didn't know any better. We didn't go to school so as far as we knew the world was exactly the way our father described it."  Westover got her undergraduate degree at Brigham Young University and her PhD at Cambridge.

Westover decided to write the book after she confronted her parents about her brother's abuse, and the resulting conflict led to her becoming estranged from some members of her family. She began searching for stories to help her understand what had happened.  In 2018, she told The New York Times, "I wrote the book I wished I could have given to myself when I was losing my family. When I was going through that experience, I became aware of how important stories are in telling us how to live — how we should feel, when we should feel proud, when we should feel ashamed. I was losing my family, and it seemed to me that there were no stories for that — no stories about what to do when loyalty to your family was somehow in conflict with loyalty to yourself. And forgiveness. I wanted a story about forgiveness that did not conflate forgiveness with reconciliation, or did not treat reconciliation as the highest form of forgiveness. In my life, I knew the two might always be separate. I didn't know if I would ever reconcile with my family, and I needed to believe that I could forgive, regardless."

Westover has said that she set out to explore the complexity of difficult family relationships. In an interview with The Irish Times, she said, "You can love someone and still choose to say goodbye to them, and you can miss someone every day and still be glad they're not in your life."

Her parents' attorney has said that "Her parents raised their family in what Tara described as an extremist mindset, but what they felt was self-sufficiency." They maintain that there is only a "little germ of truth" in her book. Their attorney said Westover's parents were hurt that Westover would write a book that slanders her upbringing and that she would accuse her brother [Shawn] of the abuse described.

Reception 
Educated was an instant #1 New York Times bestseller, and was positively reviewed by The New York Times, The Atlantic, USA Today, Vogue,The Economist, and Literary Review, which praised Westover's writing as "crisp, persuasive and heartbreaking in its honesty." The book was also nominated for a number of national awards, including the Los Angeles Times Book Prize, PEN America's Jean Stein Book Award, and two awards from the National Book Critics Circle Award.

Educated spent more than two years in hardcover on the New York Times bestseller list and is being translated into 45 languages. The New York Times ranked Educated as one of the 10 Best Books of 2018,  and The American Booksellers Association named Educated the Nonfiction Book of the Year. As of December 2020, the book had sold more than 6 million copies.

Awards and recognition 
Westover's book earned her several awards and accolades:

 2021: Indiebound's Indie Biography & Memoir Bestseller List
2019: American Library Association's (ALA) Top Ten Amazing Audiobooks for Young Adults
2019: Outstanding Books for the College Bound
2019: Westover chosen by Time magazine as one of the 100 most influential people of 2019
2019: ALA's Alex Award
2018: The National Book Critics Circle Award for Autobiography
2018: One of The New York Times 10 Best Books
2018: Amazon Editors' pick for the Best Book of 2018
Named the Book of the Year by the American Booksellers Association
 Finalist for the John Leonard Prize from the National Book Critics Circle
 Finalist for the Autobiography Award from the National Book Critics Circle
 Finalist for the Los Angeles Times Book Prize in Biography
 Finalist for PEN/America's Jean Stein Award
 Finalist for the American Booksellers Association Audiobook of the Year Award
 Finalist for Barnes & Noble's Discover Great Writers Award
 Long-listed for the Carnegie Medal of Excellence
 Winner of the Goodreads Choice Award for Autobiography
 Winner of the Audie Award for Autobiography/Memoir
 Apple's Best Memoir of the Year
 Audible's Best Memoir of the Year
 Hudson Group Best Book of the Year
 President Barack Obama's pick for summer reading and his Favorite Books of the Year list 
 Bill Gates's Holiday Reading list 
 Educated named one of the Best Books of the year by The Washington Post, O, The Oprah Magazine, Time, NPR, Good Morning America, The San Francisco Chronicle, The Guardian, The Economist, Financial Times, The New York Post, The Skimm, Bloomberg, Real Simple, Town & Country, Bustle, Publishers Weekly, The Library Journal, Book Riot, and the New York Public Library.
 Featured speaker, Seattle Arts & Lectures, 2019

References 

2018 non-fiction books
American memoirs
Random House books
Books about higher education